Hartmut Lutz (born April 26, 1945) is professor emeritus and former chair of American and Canadian studies: Anglophone literatures and cultures of North America at the University of Greifswald, Germany. He is the founder of the Institut für Anglistik und Amerikanistik, a research centre for Canadian and American literature studies at Greifswald. Beginning in the 1980s, he pioneered the field of Indigenous literary studies by establishing intercultural bridges and trans-Atlantic connections with leading Indigenous authors, scholars, educators, activists and intellectuals from Canada and the United States. He initiated studies on "Indian" stereotyping and coined the term "Indianthusiasm" to describe the fascination Germans have with all things "Indian". Throughout his career, Lutz put in practice the "nothing about us without us" principle set forth by Indigenous people and devoted himself to asking for their thoughts and to collaborating on bringing their words to a wide public in North America and Europe.

Career
Lutz was born in Rendsburg, Germany. Between 1966 and 1969, he earned a general teaching degree (up to 9th grade) and a special teaching diploma in English for high school from the Pädagogische Hochschule Kiel (PHK), a teacher training college, later merged with the University of Kiel. He earned his doctorate in English literature at the University of Tübingen, and subsequently taught English and American literature as well as North American and minority studies at the University of Osnabrück from 1975 to 1994.

Throughout his career, he has held guest professorships in Canada, Denmark, Finland, Iceland, Norway, Poland, Romania, Spain and the United States. Namely,
 As an American Council of Learned Societies and Fulbright scholar, in 1979-1980, he taught Native American Studies at the University of California, Davis, while conducting research for his 1983 habilitation at the University of Osnabrück on Indian stereotyping.
 In California, Lutz also taught at Deganawidah-Quetzalcoatl University.
 In 1990-1991, he was a DAAD guest professor at the Saskatchewan Indian Federated College, in Regina, Saskatchewan. The establishment is now known as the First Nations University of Canada.

In 1987, during his first visit to Canada, Lutz learned of the diary kept by Abraham Ulrikab, a Labrador Inuk who died in Paris while he was touring throughout Europe in one of Carl Hagenbeck's ethnographic exhibition (a human zoo). With his students, Lutz translated and contextualized the diary. In 2003, Lutz received the John G. Diefenbaker Award from the Canada Council for the Arts which brought him to the University of Ottawa's Institute of Canadian Studies for one year. During that period, the University of Ottawa Press showed interest in Lutz's work on Ulrikab's diary. His and his students' work was published in 2005 (The Diary of Abraham Ulrikab: Text and Context). At the time, Lutz had no way of knowing that this publication would be the catalyst to the discovery, in 2011, of Ulrikab's remains in the collection of the National Museum of Natural History, France.

In 1989, Lutz was the founding editor of OBEMA (Osnabrück Bilingual Editions of Minority Authors), which published twice a year bilingual editions of works by authors of colour until 1998. He remained editor until 1994.

On April 1, 1994, he assumed a professorship at the University of Greifswald, where he established the Institut für Anglistik und Amerikanistik, a research centre of Canadian studies with a particular focus on Canadian Aboriginal literature and other minority literature in Canada. His academic interests also included issues of race, class and gender in North America. Lutz facilitated speaker series, guest professorships and annual international Canadian studies conferences for Indigenous and non-Indigenous academics from Canada throughout the years he taught at Greifswald, and especially from 2009 to 2011, when he was president of the Association for Canadian Studies in the German speaking countries (Gesellschaft für Kanada-Studien (GKS) in den deutschsprachigen Ländern; GKS) (Austria, Germany, Switzerland).

For the year 2011-2012, he was a professor at the University of Szczecin, Poland.

In 2018, Hartmut Lutz donated over 1000 books by Canadian Indigenous authors and on Indigenous subjects to the Simon Fraser University. 

He continues to promote understanding of Indigenous literature through interviews, translations, lectureships and critical essays.

On November 19, 2021, he was inducted as an international fellow of the Royal Society of Canada.

Awards

Publications
Selection of books authored and/or edited by Harmut Lutz.

References

External links
 "'Indianthusiasm': Romanticized ideas about First Nations life offer escapism for Germans". National Post. October 17, 2012.

Living people
Academic staff of the University of Greifswald
People from Rendsburg
1945 births